Headingley railway station (formerly known as Headingley and Kirkstall railway station until some point early in the 20th century) is off Kirkstall Lane in Leeds, West Yorkshire, England, on the Harrogate Line,  north west of Leeds. The station was opened in 1849 by the Leeds & Thirsk Railway, later part of the Leeds Northern Railway to Northallerton.

History
The station opened in 1849, one year after the opening of the route which now forms the Harrogate Line in 1849 by two of the railways which came to be part of the North Eastern Railway: the Leeds Northern Railway and the East and West Yorkshire Junction Railway.  In the early twentieth century houses were built for railway workers by the station on Kirkstall Lane; although now in private ownership these are still existent and marked by plaques.

Facilities

The station is not staffed, though ticket vending machines are available on each platform.  Passenger information screens were also installed in 2015. There is step free access via the carpark to platform 2 (Harrogate bound), whilst access to platform 1 (Leeds Bound) is available by lifts installed in spring 2019.

The old station building and platform it stands on is no longer in railway use (the building is privately owned) - a replacement platform has been built a few yards further up the line towards Horsforth, giving the station a staggered platform configuration.

Location and areas served
The station is halfway between Headingley centre and Kirkstall, just down the road from the Headingley Stadium's rugby and cricket grounds. It is over half a mile from the centre of Headingley itself, but close to local bus routes on Kirkstall Hill, Kirkstall Road and Kirkstall Lane. It is also close to local shops and services in Kirkstall, including Kirkstall Leisure Centre.  The station also serves the West Park and Queenswood Drive areas, which it is linked to by a pedestrian footpath through the Headingley Station allotments.  The predominantly student occupied houses between Kirkstall Lane and St. Ann's Drive are also within a short walk.  It is the closest railway station to Leeds Beckett University's Beckett Park campus.

Services
Monday to Saturday daytimes, is generally a half-hourly service southbound to Leeds and a half-hourly service northbound to Knaresborough with one train per hour onwards to York. In peak hours, there are extra services to and from Leeds.

In the evening there is an hourly service in each direction (with the last two northbound departures terminating at Harrogate), whilst on Sundays there are two departures per hour to Leeds & Knaresborough and one per hour through to York (the half-hourly service frequency beyond Horsforth was introduced at the December 2017 timetable change).

Services are mostly operated by Class 170 as well as 150, 155 and 158 diesel multiple units.

Daily return expresses between Harrogate and London operated by London North Eastern Railway pass through the station but do not stop.

Buses operate close by on Kirkstall Lane.

Former services
Prior to the closure of the routes, services ran through the station on the Leeds-Northallerton railway.  Services also ran to Otley via the Arthington to Menston Line and some services were also run to Wetherby by way of the Harrogate-Church Fenton line with return to Leeds via the junction at Wetherby with the Cross Gates–Wetherby line.

Parking
The station has a small car park which is free to use for rail users, although no form of proof of travel or ticket is required.

Future

Rolling stock
In 2014 the replacement of the Pacers that were developed from the Leyland National buses in the 1980s was raised with Chancellor George Osborne; both the 142s and 144s that serve this line are both Pacers.  New Northern franchise operator Arriva Rail North has since agreed to withdraw the Pacers by 2019 and replace them with either cascaded stock or new DMUs.  A contract for new diesel & electric units was agreed with Spanish train builder CAF and rolling stock leasing company Eversholt in January 2016.

Electrification
In July 2011, Harrogate Chamber of Commerce proposed to electrify the line with 750 V DC third rail, using D Stock of the London Underground, to substantially increase capacity. This idea has not been backed by Metro, Northern Rail or National Rail and seems unlikely to garner support given the age of the D stock, the need to adapt the D stock to third rail as it runs with a fourth and the preference for overhead electrification.

See also
Leeds-Northallerton Railway
Listed buildings in Leeds (Kirkstall Ward)

References

 Bacon G.W (Circa 1900) Plan of Leeds, Kelly's Directories Ltd, London

External links

Railway stations in Leeds
DfT Category F1 stations
Former North Eastern Railway (UK) stations
Railway stations in Great Britain opened in 1849
Northern franchise railway stations
Headingley
1849 establishments in England